The Urusaro International Women Film Festival (sometimes shortened to the Urusaro Festival) is a Rwandan women's film festival. It was originally started in 2015 by a Rwandan group of women filmmakers.

Organized by Cinéfemmes Rwanda, it is intended to bring together and empower women filmmakers. The idea of holding the Kigali-based film festival was from local Rwandan filmmaker Poupoun Sesonga Kamikazi.

Awards 
 the Urusaro Festival gave awards to best films in the following categories:
 National Short Fiction
 National Documentary
 East African Short Fiction
 East African Documentary
 African Short Fiction
 African Documentary
 African Feature Fiction.

References

Further reading

External links 
 
 UNESCO – Urusaro International Women Film

Film festivals in Rwanda
Women's film festivals
Kigali
2015 establishments in Rwanda
Film festivals established in 2015